"Are You Metal?" is a song and a single from German power metal band Helloween's thirteenth studio album 7 Sinners. The single was released physically only in Japan, containing 3 songs. There was also a digital single version available worldwide, which contained only the title song "Are You Metal?", entirely composed by vocalist Andi Deris.

Music video
On 11 October the music video was released on Myspace. Visually, it draws heavily from the Saw movies.

During the keyboard intro, the band's iconic "Helloween Pumpkin" can be seen as a human doing the "Devil Horns" sign. The video features the band playing in a trashed and abandoned house. Its storyline is about three women who are trapped in the same house. They all have big metal headphones on their ears, and when they take them off, it appears that they are subjected to a painfully loud sound. However, in order to reach the key to get out (the key is seven knives put together - the same that is on the album cover of 7 Sinners) they must take off the headphones in order to fit through a small hole in the wall. The first two women do not succeed in doing this, and have to put their headphones back on. However, the third woman takes off her headphones, and when she hears the sound, she begins to headbang (It is then implied that the sound is the band's heavy metal music, or possibly just heavy metal music in general). She is able to reach the key and they are able to escape. For the second half of the video, scenes of the band playing in front of a crowd are featured, which includes snippets of Dr. Stein.

Track listing

Single (physically released only in Japan)

Notes:
 Only track 1 "Are You Metal?" is available on the digital single version.
 The single version of "Raise the Noise" is shorter than the original album version and features a guitar solo instead of the flute solo version on the album.

Credits
Andi Deris – Vocals
Michael Weikath – Guitar
Sascha Gerstner – Guitar, backing vocals
Markus Grosskopf – Bass
Dani Löble – Drums

References

External links
 https://web.archive.org/web/20101017131158/http://vids.myspace.com/index.cfm?fuseaction=vids.individual&VideoID=106777445
 Official Helloween Website 

2010 songs
Helloween songs
Songs written by Andi Deris
2010 singles

pl:As Long As I Fall